Julia Migenes (born March 13, 1943) is an American soprano working primarily in musical theatre repertoire. She was born on the Lower East Side of New York (Manhattan) to parents of Irish and Puerto Rican descent. (Her stepfather was of  Greek descent.) She is sometimes credited as Julia Migenes-Johnson. She attended The High School of Music & Art in New York City.

Julia Migenes played Tevye's second daughter, Hodel, in the original Broadway production of the long-running musical Fiddler on the Roof. She played Ciboletta in the 1973 film Eine Nacht in Venedig (re-released 2008). She also starred in the 1984 film of Carmen.

Early career on Broadway 
At age seven, Migenes originated the role of ‘Ngana’ in the first national tour of the Rodgers and Hammerstein musical South Pacific; she alternated in the role with her sister Maria. Also in the cast was her brother, John, in the role of Jerome, and her half-sister Jeanette as Bloody Mary’s Assistant (and understudy to Bloody Mary). Reportedly, the siblings made enough money from the tour to buy their family a small house in the Bronx.

She made her Broadway debut in the musical Carnival! She was a replacement understudy for the lead role of ‘Lili.’ Migenes performed the role from April 2 to April 14, 1962, when lead actress Anna Maria Alberghetti took vacation.

Migenes then took on the leading role of ‘Maria’ in the 1964 Broadway revival of West Side Story which played a limited run from April 8 to May 2, 1964, at City Center.

Migenes created the role of ‘Hodel,’ the second oldest of Tevye’s daughters in the original Broadway cast of Fiddler on the Roof. While the production ran for almost eight years (lasting over 3,200 performances and winning nine Tony Awards), Migenes’ tenure extended from the production’s first preview on September 17, 1964, through April 1, 1967. Mimi Turque succeeded her in the role of Hodel.

Personal life 
Migenes has been married four times. The first time was at age 18 to a singer whose identity remains unknown; the union was annulled two years later in 1963. 

Her second marriage to Danjo Hotnik ended in divorce, but brought Migenes her first daughter, Martina (born circa 1975). 

In 1979, Migenes married Jervis Johnson, with whom she had a second daughter, Jessica Allegra (born 1981). 

She married Hungarian film director Peter Medak in 1988; they divorced in 2003.

Selected discography

Television
Migenes has been in a few TV shows including:

Top C's and Tiaras (1982-3) Channel 4, UK: 6 episodes (with 3 pilot episodes) of songs from operetta and musical theatre.  Regular singers included Marilyn Hill Smith and Peter Morrison.  Guest singers included Benjamin Luxon, Jean Bailey, Linda Ormiston, Jill Washington, Hugh Hetherington, Neil Jenkins, and Laurence Dale.

 The Twilight Zone  "Grace Note"  (1986)
 Webster "Leave It to Diva" (1987)
 Magnum, P.I. "Pleasure Principle" (1987)

Film
Carmen (1984) as Carmen
 Berlín Blues (1988) as Lola
Mack the Knife (1989) as Jenny Diver
The Krays (1990) as Judy Garland (uncredited)

Opera
Lulu (Alban Berg). DVD 1980, Metropolitan Opera Co.

See also

List of Puerto Ricans
Irish immigration to Puerto Rico

References

External links

Profile, IBDB.com

1943 births
Living people
American film actresses
American operatic mezzo-sopranos
American people of Greek descent
The High School of Music & Art alumni
Grammy Award winners
American people of Irish descent
American operatic sopranos
People from the Lower East Side
American musicians of Puerto Rican descent
American Scientologists
Singers from New York City
20th-century American actresses
20th-century American women opera singers